The Australian Rugby Shield is a rugby union competition in Australia. It was launched in 2000 by the Australian Rugby Union (ARU), now Rugby Australia (RA). The competition was intended to unearth new talent outside of the existing rugby strongholds of Sydney and Brisbane. The competition was suspended after the 2008 season, but has since been revived.

The tournament was an important step in the development of rugby union in Australia, and provided an opportunity for Rugby Australia to identify and unearth talented players nationally. It provided regional teams and developing unions with a regular schedule to compete against each other at a higher level than would normally be possible within their individual states or territories.

Conducted under rules and regulations similar to the Super Rugby, the competition aimed to assist players, coaches, managers and referees in their professional development. It provided a pathway to full representative level including education in coaching, selecting and refereeing.

History 
The Australian Rugby Shield was first contested in 2000, with six teams playing a single round robin over five weekends and the top two teams playing in the final. The teams in the inaugural season were the Adelaide Black Falcons, Darwin Mosquitoes, Melbourne Axemen, New South Wales Country Cockatoos, Perth Gold, and Queensland Country Heelers. The New South Wales and Queensland Country teams met in the final, played as the curtain-raiser to the Bledisloe Cup match held at Stadium Australia in front of a record rugby crowd of 109,874. Queensland Country won in an upset, 23-17.

New South Wales Country went on to win the next two titles, before Perth claimed their first Australian Rugby Shield in 2003.
A first-past-the-post system was put in place in 2004, eliminating the requirement for a final. In 2006, two additional teams were added, the Tasmania Jack Jumpers and the ACT & Southern NSW Vikings team that won the Australian Rugby Shield on their first attempt. The competition was split into two pools in a three-week round robin competition with the winners and runners up in each pool progressing to the semi-finals (27 May 2006) and  cross-pool Final (3 June 2006). Contracted Super Rugby and academy players were excluded.

In 2007, the tournament reverted to a 6-team home-and-away round-robin tournament, without Perth and the Vikings. These two teams were excluded as the ARU determined that the local competitions were sufficient to foster talent for the new Australian Rugby Championship teams, the Perth Spirit and Canberra Vikings, respectively.

At the end of 2008, and citing the difficult economic environment, the ARU declared that the 2009 Australian Rugby Shield would be suspended. The involvement of the Australia A team in the Pacific Nations Cup was also cancelled.

NRC Division 2 (2018−2020) 
An Emerging States Championship was formed in 2018 for representative teams from smaller rugby unions within Australia. There had been no regular competition for these teams since the demise of Australian Rugby Shield a decade earlier. The new tournament was hosted by Rugby Union South Australia in Adelaide and featured the South Australia Black Falcons, Victoria Country Barbarians, Northern Territory Mosquitoes and Tasmania Jack Jumpers. The Black Falcons were the inaugural winners. The tournament was rebranded as NRC Division 2 for 2019, with eight representative teams invited:

  New South Wales Country Cockatoos
  Northern Territory Mosquitoes
  Perth Gold
  Queensland Country Heelers

  South Australia Black Falcons
  South Australian U23
  Tasmania Jack Jumpers
  Victoria Country Barbarians

Revival of the Competition 
During the coronavirus pandemic, Rugby Australia suffered severe economic hardship, nearing bankruptcy. These financial issues were quickly turned around by a new board and led to the reintroduction of the Australian Rugby Shield and Australia ‘A’ competitions for the 2022 season.

Held in Adelaide, teams participated from ACT & Southern New South Wales, New South Wales Country, Outback Queensland, Queensland Country, Rugby Tasmania, Rugby Victoria & Rugby Western Australia.

The ACT and Southern New South Wales Griffins were crowned champions defeating NSW Country 34–31 in the Grand Final at Brighton Oval, Adelaide.

The 2022 Australian Rugby Shield also had a women's competition, with Victoria defeating all who stood before them.

Following the conclusion of the 2022 edition, Rugby Australia came under scrutiny for not promoting the competition enough, resulting a lack of awareness in the rugby community it was taking place. Critics did praise the return of the competition as a whole, calling it a significant step in growing rugby union in regional areas.

Television coverage 
From 2000 to 2008, the competition was broadcast on national television by the digital channel ABC2. It showcased two of the Australian Rugby Shield matches each round.

In 2022, games were only available to watch via YouTube. This contributed to the criticism that Rugby Australia received in relation to the lack of the promotion this tournament received.

Participating teams 
  South Australian Black Falcons
  ACT & Southern New South Wales Griffins
  Victorian Axemen
  New South Wales Country Cockatoos
  Perth Gold
  Queensland Country Heelers
  Tasmania Jack Jumpers
  FNQ Outback Barbarians

Champions 

 2000 Queensland Country Heelers
 2001 New South Wales Country Cockatoos
 2002 New South Wales Country Cockatoos
 2003 Perth Gold
 2004 New South Wales Country Cockatoos
 2005 Perth Gold
 2006 ACT & Southern New South Wales Griffins
 2007 Victorian Axemen
 2008 New South Wales Country Cockatoos
 2009–2021 Not played
 2022 ACT & Southern New South Wales Griffins

See also 

 Australian Provincial Championship (defunct)
 Australian Rugby Championship (defunct)
 National Rugby Championship
 Super Rugby

References 

2000 establishments in Australia
Recurring sporting events established in 2000
Defunct rugby union leagues in Australia
Sports leagues established in 2000
Rugby union competitions for provincial teams